William Roy MacKenzie (commonly known as W. Roy MacKenzie) was a Canadian folklorist and writer who collected songs and ballads in Nova Scotia in the early 20th century.

Influence of Francis Child
While at Harvard, MacKenzie was among members of an increasingly prominent group of English professors influenced by the work of Francis James Child, an American folklorist who collected what is now known as the Child Ballads.

Song collecting in Nova Scotia
MacKenzie was the first of several people to collect songs in Nova Scotia, and his Ballads and Sea Songs remains an important collection of the province's traditional music.  In his introduction to MacKenzie's 1909 article in the Journal of American Folklore, Kittredge noted that,
"The conditions in Nova Scotia have been such as to render the evidence which [MacKenzie] has collected highly typical. Several processes which we are often obliged to infer or to conjecture with respect to the course of tradition through long periods of time, have there gone on with such rapidity that their history may be followed by means of the recollection of living persons."

His work influenced Helen Creighton, one of Canada's most prolific song collectors.  MacKenzie and Creighton are the most prominent collectors of Nova Scotia traditional songs, but others, such as Louise Manny, collected songs in the province as well.

Notes

References
Creighton, H. (1975). A life in folklore. Toronto, Montreal: McGraw-Hill Ryerson.
Kallmann, H. (2008). "MacKenzie, William Roy". In Encyclopedia of Music in Canada. Historica Foundation of Canada.  
MacKenzie, W.R. (1909). Ballad-singing in Nova Scotia. The Journal of American Folklore (22)85, 327–331. 
MacKenzie, W.R. (1963). Ballads and sea songs from Nova Scotia. Hatboro, PA: Folklore Associates. 421 p. 
Wilgus, D.K. (1959). Anglo-American folk song scholarship since 1898. New Brunswick, New Jersey: Rutgers University Press. xx, 466 p.

1883 births
1957 deaths
Canadian folklorists
Canadian expatriates in the United States
Harvard University alumni
Dalhousie University alumni